Muslim Peacemaker Teams, organised by Sami Rasouli, are groups of citizens, especially in Iraq, who seek to demonstrate non-violence in practice by doing such things as physically interposing themselves between warring parties, but also by acting as intermediaries and negotiators.

They are similar to the group Christian Peacemaker Teams.

They installed four water filtration systems in Najaf, the birthplace of Rasouli.

See also 
 Third Party Non-violent Intervention

References

External links
 
 Transconflict page
 Peace Insight page
 Former MPT website
 Human Shields

Peace organizations based in Iraq